The Scotland cricket team toured the United Arab Emirates in November 2017 to play two One Day Internationals (ODIs) against the Papua New Guinea  cricket team. Scotland won the series 2–0.

Squads

ODI series

1st ODI

2nd ODI

References

External links
 Series home

2017 in Scottish cricket
International cricket competitions in 2017–18
International cricket tours of the United Arab Emirates
Scottish cricket tours abroad